The Utah Valley Marathon (UVM) is an annual marathon foot-race in Northern Utah held on the first Saturday of June. The marathon course is USA Track & Field (USATF) certified and is a Boston Marathon qualifier.

History
The race was started in 2008 by Hyrum Oaks and Jeremiah West. The inaugural marathon was held on April 12, 2008.  Between 2009 and 2018, the race was moved to the second Saturday in June. Beginning in 2019, the race will be held on the first Saturday in June to avoid conflicts with local festivals. In 2008, there were 120 marathon runners.  In 2009, the number of marathon runners had grown to 748. Since 2009, the marathon has been part of the Utah Grand Slam.

The race is put on largely by volunteers. CharityVision (formerly Deseret International), Mentor's International, Mac's Gift (formerly the Children with Cancer Christmas Foundation), and Road to Success are the four primary charities.  The Children with Cancer Christmas foundation has been part of the race since its inception in 2008. In 2010, CharityVision (formerly Deseret International) was added as a second charitable recipient. In 2013, Mentor's International and the Road to Success charities were added.

Between 2008 and 2011, the event included a 5K. In 2012, the 5K distance was removed in favor of a 10K race.  In 2010, a half-marathon race was added. In 2009, twenty-five members of the Pleasant Grove Fire Department ran the marathon as part of their annual physical fitness test. The same year, the UVM was the first local race to allow footbikes.

Race courses

Marathon course
The 26 mile 385 yard course runs through Wasatch and Utah Counties. The marathon begins at 6:00 AM (MDT). The 2014 Utah Valley Marathon has a cap of 2,000 marathon runners. The race begins in Wallsburg, UT at an elevation of 5,963 feet (1,818 m) and heads northwest through Wallsburg along Highway 222.  At the intersection of U.S. Route 189, the course turns west and follows the Deer Creek Reservoir until U.S. Route 189 reaches Provo Canyon.  U.S. Route 189 is also known as the Provo Canyon Scenic Byway. The race continues southwest through Provo Canyon along the Provo River until the road merges with University Avenue (U.S. Route 189) in Orem.  The race continues south along University Avenue through Orem and Provo until the finish line at the intersection of University Avenue and Center Street at an elevation of 4,504 feet (1,373 m)

2010 was the first year that a non-Utah resident won either the men or women's marathon race. Prior to Hillary Kibet Cheruiyot (Of Kenya) winning the men's 2010 race, and Claudia Camargo-Nero (a New York resident from Argentina) winning the women's 2010 race, only United States born, Utah residents had won the marathon race for either gender. In 2011, Hillary Kibet Cheruiyot (KEN) won the men's race for the second year in a row.  Utah resident Kassi Harmon (USA), a Brigham Young University (BYU) steeplechase All-American, won the women's division. In 2012, Peter Kemboi (KEN) won the men's race for the first time.  Utah resident Emily Bates (USA) won the women's division. In 2013, Bryant Jensen (USA) won the men's race for the first time.  Amber Green (USA) won the women's division.  Both winners are Utah residents.  2013 marked a change in the marathon course.  For the first time, runners ran against traffic. Barrel cones closed off the traffic lane to oncoming automobiles providing runners with a corridor within which to run.  This change in traffic also allowed traffic to flow more smoothly at the Highway 222 and U.S. Route 189 intersection as runners do not need to cross across traffic, thus allowing traffic to flow continuously.

Half marathon course
The  course begins in Provo Canyon at the midpoint of the full marathon course. The starting line is just south of the Highway 92 and U.S. Route 189 intersection. The course follows the marathon course down through the canyon and along University Avenue until the finish line at the Provo Towne Centre mall.

In 2010, USA residents Seth Pilkington and Lindsey Dunkley won the men's and women's respective half-marathon titles. In 2011, Brad Osguthorpe won the men's half-marathon title and Andrea North won the women's half-marathon title. In 2012, Kyle Perry won the men's half-marathon title. Kassi Harmon won the women's half-marathon title. In 2013, Joshua McCabe won the men's title and Kassi Harmon repeated as the women's half-marathon title winner. The 2014 Utah Valley Half-Marathon has a cap of 2,500 runners. The half-marathon begins at 6:00 AM (MDT).

10K Course
Beginning in 2012, the race added a  event. This distance starts in the neighborhoods just south of the mouth of Provo Canyon near Canyon Crest Elementary school in Provo, and ends at the common finish area in downtown Provo at University Avenue and Center Street. The 2014 Utah Valley Marathon 10K had a cap of 2,000 runners.

5K Course 
The 5K was initially included as one of the race distances in 2008, but was discontinued in 2012. However, the 5K is now again part of the races included.

1K Course (kids race) 
In 2012, the race added a  kids race. This race is for children 12 years of age and under.  The race is free for all participants.  The race ends at the same finish line as the full marathon, half-marathon, and 10K. The 2014 Utah Valley Marathon Free Kids' 1K had a cap of 2,000 children, ages 12 or under.

List of winners

Key

Marathon distance 

*Virtual marathon only in 2020.

Half marathon distance

*Virtual marathon only in 2020.

Number of finishers

*Virtual race only in 2020, virtual race results in subsequent years in parenthesis.

See also

References

External links
 Utah Valley Marathon Official Site
 Utah Valley Marathon Online registration
 The Utah Valley Marathon at MarathonGuide.com

Marathons in the United States
Sports competitions in Utah
Wasatch Front
Tourist attractions in Utah County, Utah
Tourist attractions in Wasatch County, Utah
Provo, Utah